The 1989 Internationaux de Strasbourg was a women's tennis tournament played on outdoor clay courts in Strasbourg, France that was part of the Category 2 tier of the 1989 WTA Tour. It was the third edition of the tournament and was held from 22 May until 28 May 1989. Second-seeded Jana Novotná won the singles title.

Finals

Singles

 Jana Novotná defeated  Patricia Tarabini 6–1, 6–2
 It was Novotná's 6th title of the year and the 18th of her career.

Doubles

 Mercedes Paz /  Judith Wiesner defeated  Lise Gregory /  Gretchen Magers 6–3, 6–3
 It was Paz's 2nd title of the year and the 14th of her career. It was Wiesner's 1st title of the year and the 4th of her career.

External links
 ITF tournament edition details 
 Tournament draws

Internationaux de Strasbourg
1989
Internationaux de Strasbourg
May 1989 sports events in Europe